Lal Gopalganj Nindaura is a town and a nagar panchayat in Allahabad district in Indian state of Uttar Pradesh.

Demographics
As of 2011 Indian Census, Lal Gopalganj Nindaura had a total population of 28,288, of which 14,570 were males and 13,718 were females. Population within the age group of 0 to 6 years was 4,326. The total number of literates in Lal Gopalganj Nindaura was 15,734, which constituted 55.6% of the population with male literacy of 62.0% and female literacy of 48.8%. The effective literacy rate of 7+ population of Lal Gopalganj Nindaura was 65.7%, of which male literacy rate was 73.1% and female literacy rate was 57.7%. The Scheduled Castes and Scheduled Tribes population was 4,303 and 7 respectively. Lal Gopalganj Nindaura had 4525 households in 2011.

 India census, Lal Gopalganj Nindaura had a population of 22,739. Males constitute 53% of the population and females 47%. Lal Gopalganj Nindaura has an average literacy rate of 50%, lower than the national average of 59.5%: male literacy is 59%, and female literacy is 41%. In Lal Gopalganj Nindaura, 18% of the population is under 6 years of age.

Administration
Lal Gopalganj Nindaura has total 15 wards namely, Nindaura East, Nindaura West, Nindaura North, Nindaura South, Nindaura Middle, Nindaura South-West, Nindaura South-East, Ibrahimpur, Daniyalpur khas, Daniyalpur South-West, Rawa, Khanjahanpur, Khanjahanpur North, Umraoganj, Imamganj.

References

zia

Cities and towns in Allahabad district